Events in the year 1842 in Mexico.

Incumbents 
 President:
 Antonio López de Santa Anna until October 26
 Nicolás Bravo after October 26

Governors
 Aguascalientes:
 Chiapas: Salvador Ayanegui
 Chihuahua: 
 Coahuila: José Ignacio de Arizpe/Francisco Mejía
 Durango:  
 Guanajuato: 
 Guerrero: 
 Jalisco: Antonio Escobedo
 State of Mexico:  
 Michoacán: 
 Nuevo León: Manuel María de Llano
 Oaxaca: 
 Puebla: 
 Querétaro: Sabás Antonio Domínguez/José Francisco Figueroa/Julián Juvera 
 San Luis Potosí: 
 Sinaloa: 
 Sonora: 
 Tabasco: 
 Tamaulipas: Jose Antonio Quintero	 
 Veracruz: 
 Yucatán: Miguel Barbachano
 Zacatecas:

Events
 March 5 – Mexican troops led by Rafael Vasquez invade Texas, briefly occupy San Antonio, and then head back to the Rio Grande. This is the first such invasion since the Texas Revolution.

Notable births
 September 8 – Juan José Carrillo, Mayor of Santa Monica, California was born in Santa Barbara, Alta California (died 1916)
 October 8 – Francisco del Paso y Troncoso, historian and Nahuatl scholar was born in Veracruz, Veracruz (died 1916)

Notable deaths
 August 24 – Leona Vicario, supporter of the Mexican War of Independence and wife of Andrés Quintana Roo (born 1789)

Dates unknown
 Silvestre De León, soldier and third Alcalde of Victoria murdered in Victoria (born 1802)
 José Mariano Elízaga, composer died in Morelia (born 1786)
 Agustín V. Zamorano, printer and Governor of Alta California died in San Diego (born 1798)

Notes

 
Mexico
Years of the 19th century in Mexico